The Speak of the Devil Tour was the third solo tour by English heavy metal singer Ozzy Osbourne, in support of his first live album, Speak of the Devil, taking place from December 1982 to May 1983. The tour included two European legs, one North American leg, and a final show at the 1983 US Festival. The personnel in Osbourne's band changed several times during the tour.

Overview

Background
in early 1982, Osbourne's management and record label decided that he should record a live album consisting entirely of songs by his previous band Black Sabbath, for purposes of generating royalties and fulfilling international distribution contracts, and to compete with an upcoming Black Sabbath live album. The plan was opposed by Osbourne's then-current live band (guitarist Randy Rhoads, bassist Rudy Sarzo, and drummer Tommy Aldridge), who considered an all-covers album detrimental to their careers. Plans were put on hold after the death of Rhoads in a plane crash on March 19.

After a brief period with Bernie Tormé, the guitarist position in Osbourne's band was eventually filled by Brad Gillis. The lineup of Gillis, Sarzo, and Aldridge toured with Osbourne in the Spring and Summer of 1982, ostensibly still supporting Osbourne's 1981 album Diary of a Madman, and during some additional dates in September 1982 the band played only Black Sabbath songs. Those shows were recorded and various songs were compiled for the live album Speak of the Devil, released in November 1982.

Tour schedule and personnel changes 
A tour to support the Speak of the Devil album was scheduled for December 1982 to April 1983. By this point bassist Rudy Sarzo had quit Osbourne's band and rejoined his previous band Quiet Riot. Sarzo was temporarily replaced by former UFO bassist Pete Way. Keyboardist Lindsay Bridgewater, who had made guest appearances on Osbourne's two previous studio albums, also joined the touring band. This lineup performed seven shows in Europe in December 1982, after which Way and Gillis left the band, with the latter then forming Night Ranger.

After a holiday break, Osbourne recruited another temporary touring bassist, Don Costa (later of W.A.S.P.), plus former Rough Cutt guitarist Jake E. Lee, who would become a fixture in Osbourne's band for the next several years. This lineup performed a second leg of concerts in Europe in January 1983. Bridgewater then left the band and was replaced by Don Airey, who had already toured with Osbourne in 1981-82.

The North American leg of the tour began in Syracuse, New York on February 11. The following night's show at a Catholic community center in Scranton, Pennsylvania was cancelled after protests from parents and local community leaders. Similar protests led to the cancellation of a later show in Green Bay, Wisconsin. The main tour ended in early April, after which Osbourne welcomed back longtime bassist Bob Daisley, who replaced Costa for an appearance at the US Festival on May 29. The musicians at this performance (Jake E. Lee, Don Airey, Bob Daisley, and Tommy Aldridge) remained as Osbourne's backing band for his next album, Bark at the Moon, which was recorded in the following months.

Personnel

Speak of the Devil live album
Ozzy Osbourne – Vocals
Brad Gillis – Guitar
Rudy Sarzo – Bass
Tommy Aldridge – Drums

United Kingdom
Ozzy Osbourne – Vocals
Brad Gillis – Guitar
Pete Way – Bass
Tommy Aldridge – Drums
Lindsay Bridgwater – Keyboards

Europe
Ozzy Osbourne – Vocals
Jake E. Lee – Guitar
Don Costa – Bass
Tommy Aldridge – Drums
Lindsay Bridgwater – Keyboards

North America
Ozzy Osbourne – Vocals
Jake E. Lee – Guitar
Don Costa – Bass
Tommy Aldridge – Drums
Don Airey – Keyboards

US Festival '83
Ozzy Osbourne – Vocals
Jake E. Lee – Guitar
Bob Daisley – Bass
Tommy Aldridge – Drums
Don Airey – Keyboards

Setlists

Speak of the Devil Black Sabbath covers
"Symptom of the Universe"
"Snowblind"
"Black Sabbath"
"Fairies Wear Boots"
"War Pigs"
"The Wizard"
"N.I.B."
"Sweet Leaf"
"Never Say Die"
"Sabbath Bloody Sabbath"
"Iron Man"
 "Children of the Grave"
"Paranoid" [encore]

Europe
"Diary of a Madman" (Introduction/ending) [Introduction]
"Over the Mountain"
"Mr Crowley"
"Crazy Train"
"Revelation Mother Earth"
"Steal Away the Night"
"Suicide Solution"
Brad Gillis guitar solo and instrumental band jam
Tommy Aldridge drum solo and instrumental band jam [Reprise]
"Goodbye to Romance"
"I Don't Know"
"Believer"
"Flying High Again"
"Sweet Leaf" (Black Sabbath cover)
"Iron Man" and "Children of the Grave" (Black Sabbath covers)
"Paranoid" (Black Sabbath cover) [encore]

Europe and North America
"Diary of a Madman" (Introduction/ending) [Introduction]
"I Don't Know"
"Mr Crowley"
"Crazy Train"
"Suicide Solution" [and Jake E. Lee guitar solo]
"Revelation Mother Earth"
"Steal Away the Night"
Tommy Aldridge drum solo
"Believer"
"Flying High Again"
"Fairies Wear Boots" (Black Sabbath cover)
"War Pigs" (Black Sabbath cover)
"Iron Man" and "Children of the Grave" (Black Sabbath covers)
"Paranoid" (Black Sabbath cover) [encore]

US Festival
"Diary of a Madman" (Introduction/ending) [Introduction]
"Over the Mountain"
"Mr Crowley"
"Crazy Train"
"Suicide Solution" [and Jake E. Lee guitar solo]
"Revelation Mother Earth"
"Steal Away the Night"
Tommy Aldridge drum solo
"I Don't Know"
"Flying High Again"
"Fairies Wear Boots" (Black Sabbath cover)
"Iron Man" and "Children of the Grave" (Black Sabbath covers)
"Paranoid" (Black Sabbath cover) [encore]

Tour dates

References

Ozzy Osbourne concert tours
1982 concert tours
1983 concert tours